Afshin Hajipour (17 December 1975) is a retired Iranian football midfielder who played for Foolad Ahwaz, Esteghlal Tehran and Sepahan Isfahan.

References

1975 births
Iranian footballers
Foolad FC players
Esteghlal F.C. players
Sepahan S.C. footballers
Living people
Association football midfielders
Sportspeople from Khuzestan province
Iran international footballers